The Central West New Guinea languages are a group of Trans–New Guinea families in central New Guinea established by Timothy Usher, though with precedents in earlier studies.

Languages
The languages are as follows: 

Awyu–Ok
Digul River (Greater Awyu)
Kamula–Elevala
Ok
Momuna–Mek
Mek
Momuna (Somahai)

Voorhoeve (1975) noted a connection between Somahai and the Ok and Dumut languages, but did not consider Mek. (See Central and South New Guinea languages.)

The Oksapmin language is sometimes classified as the nearest relative of Ok. However, it's unclear whether the similarities are due to relationship or to contact between Oksapmin and Mountain Ok (or both).

Proto-Anim is reconstructed with similar pronouns to Proto-Awyu–Ok.

References

 
Trans–New Guinea languages